Ariettes oubliées... (Forgotten Arias...) is the second full-length album by Les Discrets, released in 2012 by Prophecy Productions. "Ariettes oubliées... I: Je Devine à travers un murmure..." was released as a music video directed by Audrey Hadorn.

Track listing

Personnel

 Les Discrets
 Fursy Teyssier - lead vocals, guitars, bass, artwork
 Winterhalter - drums
 Audrey Hadorn - spoken vocals

 Additional musicians
  Gianluca Divirgilio (Arctic Plateau) - vocals in "Ariettes oubliées... II: Il Pleure dans mon cœur..."

References

External links

 Prophecy Productions
 

Les Discrets albums
2012 albums